Grigory Alekseevich Falko (born 9 May 1987) is an Olympic and national-record-holding breaststroke swimmer from Russia. He swam for Russia at the 2004 and 2008 Olympics.

He swam for Russia at:
Olympics: 2004, 2008
World Championships: 2005, 2007, 2009
World University Games: 2007
European Championships: 2008
SC Worlds: 2010
SC Europeans: 2004, 2005, 2007

Falko is married to the Olympic synchronized swimmer Alexandra Patskevich, they have a son Semyon (born 2019).

See also
List of Russian records in swimming

References

External links
 
 
 

1987 births
Living people
Russian male breaststroke swimmers
Olympic swimmers of Russia
Swimmers at the 2004 Summer Olympics
Swimmers at the 2008 Summer Olympics
Swimmers from Saint Petersburg
European Aquatics Championships medalists in swimming
Universiade medalists in swimming
Universiade gold medalists for Russia
Medalists at the 2007 Summer Universiade